The National Premier Leagues Capital Football 1 (also known as NPL ACT 1 or simply NPL1) is a soccer competition contested by clubs affiliated to Capital Football. The league is the highest level (level 1) competition in the Australian Capital Territory (ACT) region. It is a subdivision of the National Premier Leagues and sits in Level 2 in the overall Australian league system.

History

The competition was restructured after the 2006 season, based on criterion requiring a development pathway within clubs where each club must field a team in a reserves and Under-18 divisions.  Nine teams contested in the Premier League in 2007, cutting Gungahlin Juventus, White Eagles and reigning premier Cooma Tigers from the top tier.

The same nine teams remained in the Premier League for 2008 and 2009.  The pathway system was expanded to include a Premier U16 competition, with all nine clubs required to field a team from their club or an affiliated club.  Capital Football initially revoked the licence of Queanbeyan City for the 2009 season, citing a non-compliance with the developmental and administrative standards expected for the league.  However, Queanbeyan were reinstated on appeal and following the presentation of further evidence demonstrating these standards could be met.

At the close of the 2009 season, the licences of all participating clubs were reviewed and expressions of interest sought for new additional entrants to the competition for 2010–2012.

In November 2014 Woden Weston FC was incorporated with the intention to merge the elite levels of Woden Valley FC and Weston Molonglo FC into one club, to compete in the National Premier Leagues in 2015 and beyond. The new merged club was officially launched on 20 February 2015, with colours for their new strip sourced from both clubs (black from Weston Creek and red from Woden Valley).

In 2016 the league was expanded to 10 teams with the addition of the Canberra United Academy (CUA) team. The decision by Capital Football to include the CUA in the top division of ACT soccer was met with opposition by other clubs in the league, citing concern with the prospect of losing their best young players to the Academy.  Along with the addition of the CUA, other clubs were concerned with lack of action taken on making the Presidents of the NPL clubs voting members of the Capital Football board. A possible rebel league was mooted, and it was believed there had already been contact made with the Referees' Association and potential sponsorship lined up by the NPL clubs.

2016 also saw the establishment of the Capital Football Charity Shield to be played between the Federation Cup winners and NPL league champions before the start of the regular NPL season, as a charity fund-raiser. The inaugural Capital Football Charity Shield match was contested on 18 March 2016 between Canberra FC (2015 League premiers) and Gungahlin United (2015 Federation Cup winners) at Gungahlin Enclosed Oval.

7 November 2016, Capital Football announced the introduction of Riverina Rhinos for the men's and boy's National Premier Leagues Capital Football for 2017. Riverina has replaced the controversial Canberra United Academy, who have been amalgamated with the FFA Centre of Excellence, maintaining a ten team league.

18 March 2017, Canberra Olympic won the first piece of ACT soccer silverware for the 2017 season with an emphatic 5–2 victory over Tigers FC at Gungahlin Enclosed oval to claim the second edition of the ACT Charity Shield. The match raised $1500 for charity CanTeen Australia with both clubs and Capital Football each contributing $500. Joshua Gulevski and Stephen Domenici both scored braces for Olympic while a long range goal from Robbie Cattanach clinched the high scoring victory for last season's league and final double winners.

Competition format

NPL1 Teams play a league season, followed by a finals series for the top 4 clubs. Clubs are required to field teams in all age groups (1st Grade and Under-20s).

A cup competition is contested by Premier League teams and other teams from the region, known as the Westfield FFA Cup Qualifiers, for which the winner is awarded the Federation Cup.  The winners of the Federation Cup gain entry into the national FFA Cup competition.

Promotion and relegation

In 2019, the NPL ACT 2 competition was formed. The bottom team from NPL 1 competition was relegated for the 2020 season.

Clubs

2023 season
The following clubs  competed in the 2023 season.

Former Premier League or NPL clubs

Honours

NPL seasons (2013–present)

A snapshot of each NPL Capital Football 1 season since the formation of the NPL in 2013.

NPL all-time record

National Premier Leagues Capital Football honours since introduction in 2013.

Pre-NPL Honours

Pre-NPL seasons (1952–2012)

A snapshot of each ACT top division season between 1952 and 2012 before the NPL started in 2013.

Pre-NPL all-time record
Pre-NPL era Division 1 honours since 1952.

See also

Soccer in the Australian Capital Territory
Sport in the Australian Capital Territory
National Premier Leagues

Notes

References

External links
Capital Football home
NPL Capital Football Page
NPL Australia home
NPL Capital Football Archive website

 

Soccer leagues in the Australian Capital Territory
Soccer in the Australian Capital Territory
Soccer in Canberra
National Premier Leagues